Per Engebret Stockfleth Enger (24 February 1929 – 19 November 2018) was a Norwegian zoophysiologist.

He was born in Oslo as a son of painter Erling Enger (1899–1990) and office clerk Aud Stockfleth (1899–1987). He took the dr.philos. degree in 1963 on the thesis Single unit activity in the fish auditory system. He was hired at the University of Oslo in 1956, and served as a professor of zoophysiology from 1975 to 1994. He is a fellow of the Norwegian Academy of Science and Letters.

References

1929 births
2018 deaths
Scientists from Oslo
20th-century Norwegian zoologists
Academic staff of the University of Oslo
Members of the Norwegian Academy of Science and Letters